"Sulfur" is the fourth single from American heavy metal band Slipknot's fourth album All Hope Is Gone. The single was released on June 15, 2009, after a video was released on April 18, 2009. This was the last Slipknot video to feature their full original lineup with both bassist Paul Gray, who died the next year, and also the final appearance from Joey Jordison who was fired from the band four years later, before his death in July 2021.

"Sulfur", "Duality" and "Psychosocial" became downloadable content in Rock Band on December 8, 2009.

Background

Music video
The video was filmed on March 9, 2009 (just two days before the end of the All Hope Is Gone World Tour) in the Los Angeles area. It was codirected by percussionist Shawn Crahan and P. R. Brown; the latter's third Slipknot video. On April 14, 2009, Slipknot released a thirty-second preview of the video through MTV and announced it would be premiered on Headbangers Ball on April 18, 2009.

The video depicts the nine members playing in groups of three as well as footage of each member submerged underwater. Crahan explained that when he writes treatments for their videos he thinks, "What has Slipknot not done? What can we embark upon that will be fun and knowledge-enhancing instead of the same old song and dance?", saying that the members themselves are the treatment for this video. This further shows that they always try to give their fans as much of themselves as they can even though they are tired of live performances; revealing that, to change things up, they shot the members performing in groups of three. The concept of the members appearing individually underwater was modeled after a video installation entitled "Ascension" by video artist Bill Viola.

Crahan explained that the smell of sulfur is "something people either love or hate, and if you hate it, then it can be suffocating", so they incorporated water as a visual representation of that. He revealed that the members felt uncomfortable when shooting in an eleven-foot glass tank; explaining, "You had to go up this really weird ladder and the water was dirty and it was a five-foot by five-foot tank and it looked like when you stepped into it you were gonna hit your head on the frame that holds the glass and it would just rip your nose off," but added that it was his favorite video so far "because it involved that fear". Chris Fehn expressed anxiety about the jump and Taylor was at one point "impaled" by one of Craig Jones' spikes. When Shawn comes up he does it with his baseball bat.

As of September 2021, the song has over 100 million views on YouTube.

Track listing
Radio Mix Digital Download
"Sulfur"  – 4:03

 Digital Download 
 "Sulfur"  – 4:37
 "Sulfur"  – 5:03

US Promo CD
 "Sulfur"  – 3:59
 "Sulfur" – 4:37

EU Promo CD
 "Sulfur"  – 4:01
 "Sulfur"  – 4:37

Charts

Personnel

(#8) Corey Taylor – vocals
(#7) Mick Thomson – guitar
(#4) Jim Root – guitar
(#2) Paul Gray – bass
(#1) Joey Jordison – drums
(#6) Shawn Crahan – percussion, vocals, music video director
(#3) Chris Fehn – percussion, vocals
(#0) Sid Wilson – turntables, keyboards
(#5) Craig Jones – samples

 Dave Fortman – producer
 Jeremy Parker – engineering
 Colin Richardson – mixer
 Matt Hyde – mix engineering
 Oli Wright – assistant engineering
 Ted Jensen – mastering
 P. R. Brown – director

References

2009 singles
Slipknot (band) songs
2008 songs
Songs written by Corey Taylor
Songs written by Paul Gray (American musician)
Roadrunner Records singles
Songs written by Joey Jordison
Songs written by Jim Root
Thrash metal songs
American hard rock songs
Melodic metalcore songs

simple:Sulfur